The Medical Counselling Committee (MCC) is an organisation under the Directorate General of Health Services (DGHS) affiliated to the Ministry of Health and Family Welfare, Government of India.

MCC is responsible for allotting seats for undergraduate, postgraduate and super-specialty medical and dental courses in government-run/aided colleges and deemed-to-be-university colleges.

MCC allots seats online on the basis of the candidate's score in the National Eligibility cum Entrance Test (NEET). Factors considered during allotment are merit, reservation eligibility and the preference list submitted by the candidate.

Under-Graduate admissions

The MCC conducts the seat allotment process for 15% (All India quota, AIQ) seats in all government-run/aided colleges and variable number of seats in deemed colleges for MBBS and BDS courses.

Usually, the counselling starts a few days after the declaration of the result of NEET-UG exam and the counselling scheme, counselling schedule, list of participating institutes, seat matrix and frequently asked questions are put up on its website (referenced below).

References

Ministry of Health and Family Welfare